Valencia is a province of Spain, in the central part of the autonomous Valencian Community. Of the province's over 2.5 million people (2018), one-third live in the capital, Valencia, which is also the capital of the autonomous community and the 3rd biggest city in Spain, with a metropolitan area of 2,522,383 people it is also one of the most populated cities of Southern Europe. There are 265 municipalities in the province.

History
Although the Spanish Constitution of 1812 loosely created the province of València, a stable administrative entity does not arise until the territorial division of Spain in 1833, remaining today without major changes. The Provincial Council of Valencia dates from that period. After the Valencian Statute of Autonomy of 1982, the province became part of the Valencian Community. Valencian and Spanish are the official languages.

Geography
It is bordered by the provinces of Alicante, Albacete, Cuenca, Teruel, Castellón, and the Mediterranean Sea. The northwestern side of the province is in the mountainous Sistema Ibérico area. Part of its territory, the Rincón de Ademuz, is an exclave sandwiched between the provinces of Cuenca and Teruel. The province is historically subdivided into the comarques of Camp de Túria, Camp de Morvedre, Canal de Navarrés, Costera, Hoya de Buñol, Horta de València, Horta Nord, Horta Oest, Horta Sud, Valencia, Requena-Utiel, Rincón de Ademuz, Ribera Alta, Ribera Baixa, Safor, Los Serranos, Vall d'Albaida and Valle de Cofrentes.

The province of Valencia, like the rest of the region, is mountainous in the interior, particularly in the north and west, with the Sistema Central running from north to south and the foothills of Andalusia from west to east. This mountainous interior features deep and steep valleys formed by the major rivers running through it. The plain of Valencia, is the second largest coastal plain of the country, located in the low region between the Júcar and Turia river valleys. It is about thirty miles long and twenty wide; on three sides it is bounded by the mountains of Segura, and on the fourth by the sea. In 1843 it was cited as "one of the most fertile and best cultivated spots in Europe". The other main rivers include the Palancia and the Serpis. The Altiplano de Requena-Utiel range, in the interior of the Valencia region, has an average height of about 750 m.  The principal mountains in the province are Cerro Calderón (1837 m), Sierra del Caroche (1126 m), Sierra del Benicadell (1104 m), Serra Calderona (1015 m), Sierra Martés (1085 m), Sierra de Utiel (1306 m), Sierra de Enguera (1056 m), and the Sierra de Mondúver (841 m).

Municipalities

Economy
The València plains are known for their olive, mulberry, ilex, algaroba, orange, and palm trees, with the appearance of an "immense garden". Such is the fertility of the soil, that two and three crops in the year are generally obtained, and the greater part of the land returns eight per cent. The rice crops are the most valuable, and are chiefly produced in the tract which is irrigated by the Albufera, a large lake in the neighbourhood of València. Rice being the principal food of the lower classes, the crop is generally consumed in the province, with the exception of a small quantity which finds its way into Castile and Andalusia. The other chief product is the white mulberry, once the source of great wealth: it was worked in the silk-factories of València. In 1828, the produce of silk from the vega of València amounted to one million of pounds yearly, the greater part of which was exported in its raw state, but the produce has greatly increased since, owing to demands from the manufacturers of Lyon and other towns in the south of France. The province of València is a notable producer of satins, silk ribbons, and velvets. The export of fruit from Valencia is also considerable, particularly of raisins. The raisins are of two kinds, the muscatel, and an inferior and smaller raisin, called pasa de legia. The export of figs, oil, and wine from the province and ports of València is also considerable, with a wine known as Beni Carlo, which as of 1843 was shipped to Cette. Mercury, copper, sulphur, arsenic, argentiferous lead, iron, coal, etc. are among the mineral products, but they are procured only in small quantities. Today, tourism is a major source of income, with the city of Valencia and the resort towns along the coast being the primary earners during the summer months.

Population
The historical population is given in the following chart:

Notes

References

External links